Vitaly Aleksandrovich Petrakov (born 10 December 1954) is a Soviet former cyclist. He won the silver medal in the  Men's team pursuit at the 1976 Summer Olympics. He won the gold medal in the men's team pursuit at the 1980 Summer Olympics.

References

1954 births
Living people
Cyclists at the 1976 Summer Olympics
Cyclists at the 1980 Summer Olympics
Olympic cyclists of the Soviet Union
Olympic gold medalists for the Soviet Union
Olympic silver medalists for the Soviet Union
Soviet male cyclists
Olympic medalists in cycling
Medalists at the 1976 Summer Olympics
Medalists at the 1980 Summer Olympics
Sportspeople from Tula, Russia
Russian track cyclists